Megacephala australis is a species of tiger beetle in the subfamily Cicindelinae that was described by Chaudoir in 1865, and is endemic to Australia.

References

Beetles described in 1865
Endemic fauna of Australia
Beetles of Australia